Northeastern Illinois University (NEIU) is a public university in Chicago, Illinois. NEIU serves approximately 9,000 students in the region and is a Hispanic-serving institution. The main campus is located in the community area of North Park with three additional campuses in the metropolitan area. NEIU has one of the longest running free-form community radio stations, WZRD Chicago 88.3 FM.

History 

The university traces its history to Chicago Teachers College (now Chicago State University), which as Cook County Normal School was founded in 1867 to train elementary and high school teachers. In 1949, Chicago Teachers College (CTC)   established the Chicago Teachers College (North Side) branch. The school relocated to the present site at North Park, Chicago in 1961 and changed its name in 1965 to Illinois Teachers' College: Chicago North when control of CTC passed into the hands of the State of Illinois.

In 1967, the Illinois Legislature acted to remove the title of “teachers college” from all state colleges and universities and the college became Northeastern Illinois State College.

In 1971, the school became Northeastern Illinois University after it was granted university status and was given a mandate by the Illinois Legislature "to offer such courses of instruction as shall best serve to qualify teachers for the schools of the State; and to offer such other courses of instruction, conduct such research and offer such public services as are prescribed by the Board of Governors of State Colleges and Universities or its successor."

In January 1996, Northeastern Illinois University established its own Board of Trustees.

In September 2016, Northeastern first began to offer on-campus housing for its students.  It was constructed on land that was formerly a University parking lot.

Initial plans to expand and construct new dormitories on land seized through eminent domain from the neighborhood were delayed because of strenuous objections from the neighborhood, social activists, some of the faculty, students, and alumni. Beginning the pursuit of the neighborhood land in 2014, the properties were  acquired by the University through eminent domain in 2016. Construction is still several years away due to decline in student enrollment.  In the meantime, long time residences and businesses have been displaced, and the affected buildings sit empty.

Academics 
Undergraduate and master's degrees are offered in four colleges:
College of Arts and Sciences
College of Business and Technology
Daniel L. Goodwin College of Education
College of Graduate Studies and Research

Campus
NEIU comprises the following instructional buildings:
Lech Walesa Hall (LWH):  The LWH houses the Daniel L. Goodwin College of Education.
Bernard J Brommel Hall (BBH): The BBH building encompasses the College of Arts and Sciences and many of its departments.
Salme Harju Steinberg Fine Arts Center (FA): The FA building houses the Department of Communication, Media & Theatre, Department of Music & Dance, and the Art Department.
The Nest: NEIU's new residence hall. In the new residence hall, students have access to a fitness center and a study area.
Ronald Williams Library: Northeastern Illinois University Library. The library has 5 floors, with multiple computer labs, audio labs, and a cafe.
Carruthers Center of Inner City Studies (CCICS): This campus is located on the south side of Chicago, in the Bronzeville neighborhood. The center is for the African-American community and houses the Inner City Studies program.
Alumni Center: The Alumni Center is a meeting place and resource center for all NEIU alum. The center also houses many pictures and memorabilia from famous alums.

Athletics

Northeastern Illinois competed in the National Association of Intercollegiate Athletics for 20 years until joining the higher profile National Collegiate Athletic Association in 1988. After a transitional season at the Division II level, NEIU moved its athletic program to Division I.

The Golden Eagles played as independents until finding a place in the short-lived East Coast Conference for the 1993–94 season. Northeastern Illinois were then invited to join the Mid-Continent Conference, now known as the Summit League, where it would play for the next four years. The University eliminated all intercollegiate sports in 1998.

The Northeastern Illinois Golden Eagles men's basketball team played from 1988 to 1998 and held home games in the Physical Education Complex.

Chief among the highlights of this era was the baseball team's 1996 Mid-Continent Conference championship and NCAA Tournament bid. Men's basketball player Andrell Hoard won the ESPN National Slam Dunk Competition but lost the conference championship to Valparaiso University by one point in a nationally televised game where ingloriously the Golden Eagle's Mascot committed a technical foul by body slamming the other mascot at center count like a linebacker on national TV making ESPN's daily highlights. More importantly the women's basketball coach Denise Taylor was chosen to lead the Utah Starzz of the WNBA in 1997 and women's basketball player Delores Jones was a participant in the 1998 WNBA draft.

The school's football team was a charter member of the Division III Illini-Badger Football Conference, where it won five conference titles before dropping the sport in 1988.

In 1977, a men's club soccer team was formed by students from local soccer organizations around Chicago to compete against college varsities from surrounding region. This club, guided by player/coach Frank Hermantz, won all of its games. Varsity status was not granted, however, and the team parted ways.

In 2005, a group of students created a new NEIU baseball club. The Eagles were made up of 24 current students who competed against other collegiate baseball clubs in the Midwest including programs at Columbia College Chicago, Northwestern University, Roosevelt University, and the University of Wisconsin–Madison.

In addition to the baseball club, the University also has other programs such as women's volleyball, women's soccer, men's soccer, aikido, Brazilian jiu-jitsu, ice hockey, and women's softball. All intramural sports clubs are created and organized by students with the support of the campus recreation department and registered through IMLeagues.
NEIU offers a course called Judo and Self Defense. In 2019, the Golden Eagles Tomodachi Judo Club was formed by students and a faculty member.

Notable faculty
 Sarah Hoagland
 Libby Komaiko
 John R. Powers
 Leo Segedin
 Conrad Worrill

Notable alumni
 Muhammed al-Ahari, Islamic essayist and scholar
 Lorrainne Sade Baskerville, social worker and activist 
 Michael Angelo Batio, guitarist
 Maria Antonia Berrios, former member of the Illinois House of Representatives 
 Bob Biggins, former member of the Illinois House of Representatives 
 Candy Dawson Boyd, writer and activist 
 Walter Burnett, Jr., Chicago alderman 
 Ana Castillo, writer
 Danny Crawford, professional basketball referee 
 John C. D'Amico, member of the Illinois House of Representatives
 Don Digirolamo, Academy Award-winning re-recording mixer
 Miguel del Valle, former Chicago City Clerk and former Illinois State Senator
 Sara Feigenholtz, member of the Illinois House of Representatives
 Calvin L. Giles, former member of the Illinois House of Representatives
 Luis V. Gutiérrez, first Latino to be elected to Congress from the Midwest
 Alan Hargesheimer, Major League Baseball pitcher
 Robert Jordan, veteran journalist and retired news anchor for WGN-TV in Chicago
 Margaret Laurino, former Chicago alderman
 Iris Y. Martinez, Illinois State Senator
 Tim McIlrath, singer of Rise Against
 John Pankow, actor
 Art Porter, Jr., saxophonist
 Delia Ramirez, member of the US House of Representatives for Illinois's 3rd congressional district
 Warner Saunders, Newscaster, WMAQ-TV in Chicago 
 Dr. Christopher J. Schneider, award-winning professor at Wilfrid Laurier University
 Ed H. Smith, former Chicago alderman
 Juliana Taimoorazy, Assyrian activist, founder and current president of the Iraqi Christian Relief Council
 Keeanga-Yamahtta Taylor, Princeton University professor of African-American Studies, activist, and 2021 MacArthur "Genius Grant" recipient. 
 Karen Yarbrough, Cook County Recorder of Deeds, former member of the Illinois House of Representatives

References

External links 
 

 
State universities in Illinois
Public universities and colleges in Illinois
Universities and colleges in Chicago
Educational institutions established in 1949
1949 establishments in Illinois